Conflict of Wings is a 1954 British comedy drama film directed by John Eldridge and starring John Gregson, Muriel Pavlow and Kieron Moore. The film is based on a novel of the same title by Don Sharp who later became a noted director.

It was a production of Group 3 Films with backing from the NFFC. Shooting took place at Beaconsfield Studios and on location in Norfolk. The film's sets were designed by the art director Ray Simm. It is one of the rare British aviation films that focused on the ground crew as opposed to aircrew. It was distributed by British Lion.

Plot
A small Norfolk village is outraged when it is discovered that the Ministry of Land Acquisition proposes to take over the nearby Island of Children, a bird sanctuary, for the RAF to use as a ground attack firing range. A struggle of wills begins between the authorities and the villagers, who resort to a variety of ways to prevent damage to the historic island. Harry Tilney is all for taking on the government, but his compatriot, Sally has a boyfriend stationed at the nearby Royal Air Force base, Corporal Bill Morris, so she goes to see him first.

Meanwhile, Squadron Leader Parsons is informed that his unit's mission is being changed to ground attack. The de Havilland Vampire jets have to be modified to mount rockets. Parsons is informed he will have three weeks for the conversion, then four weeks to get his men trained. His commanding officer is not at liberty to inform him that the unit will then be sent overseas, but he takes the hint.

The land acquisition is assigned to a bureaucrat, Mr. Wentworth, which is rather awkward for him, as he is a prominent member of a bird watching society. He comes to discuss the situation with Harry, but Harry is drunk and drives him away. The villagers then learn that fishing rights to the area were granted to the people by Henry VIII. "Soapy", the professional eel catcher, can squat on the land and use those rights to block the acquisition. However, Soapy receives a letter from the government stating that there is no evidence that such rights exist.

"Bookie" then discovers that the land was given to the Church by Henry VIII for assistance in quelling a rebellion. The villagers present this information to Parsons. He agrees to pass it along to the Government, but in the meantime he insists on continuing with the training.

In desperation, the local people take to their boats and sail to the island, to occupy the target area and prevent the first attack run. However, the field telephone wire is broken as they come ashore, meaning the RAF controller on the range cannot get a message through to have the flight cancelled. Low cloud cover conceals the site from the approaching aircraft, which commence their attack run, but fortunately the protestors are spotted by the leading aircraft and the attack is aborted just in time to avoid a disaster.

The near miss means that there will have to be an official inquiry, which will take months or a year, by which time the unit will have been sent to Malaya.

Cast

 John Gregson as Cpl. Bill Morris 
 Muriel Pavlow as Sally 
 Kieron Moore as Sqn. Ldr. Parsons
 Niall MacGinnis as Harry Tilney
 Harry Fowler as L.A.C. "Buster" 
 Guy Middleton as The Adjutant
 Sheila Sweet as Fanny Bates 
 Campbell Singer as Flt. Sgt. Campbell
 Frederick Piper as Joe Bates
 Russell Napier as Wg. Cdr. Rogers 
 Bartlett Mullins as "Soapy"
 Edwin Richfield as "Smother" Brooks 
 Margaret Withers as Mrs. Tilney 
 Howard Connell as F/O Flying Control 
 Beryl Cooke as Miss Nelson 
 Tony Doonan as Range Cpl.
 John Gale as Range L.A.C. 
 Brian Harding as 1st Pilot 
 Barbara Hicks as Mrs. Thompson 
 Humphrey Lestocq as Sqn. Ldr. Davidson 
 Charles Lloyd-Pack as "Bookie" 
 William Mervyn as Mr. Wentworth / Col. Wentworth
 Brian Moorehead as 3rd Pilot
 Hugh Moxey as Mr. Ruddle
 Dorothea Rundle as Mrs. Trotter
 Harold Siddons as Flt. Lt. Edwards
 David Spenser as Cpl. Flying Control
 Peter Swanwick Sgt. Working Party
 Guy Verney as 2nd Pilot
 Gwenda Wilson as Miss Flew
 George Woodbridge as 'Old Circular' (Man in charge of Pumping-Station)

Original novel
Conflict of Wings was based on a story by Don Sharp who had written a number of films for Group Three Productions. He pitched the idea for the film to Group Three, and wrote it up as a novel and as a screenplay. Sharp wrote the screenplay in collaboration with John Pudney.
 
A reviewer from the Sydney Morning Herald described the novel as follows:
This reviewer's guess is that the story began as a film scenario, which could explain the precise, illustrative, uninspired style of the novel. Tasmanian-born Don Sharp has been in turn actor, broadcaster and film producer; and a background of that kind rarely favours the novel form. One sees its influence in sentences such as: "The villagers greeted Sally conventionally"-a playwright's note of guidance to a producer, rather than a novelist's picture of a scene ... Behind the quietly amusing account of this controversy [the storyline] is the larger question whether English tradition must bow before the needs of national security, and Don Sharp debates it with intelligent sympathy. But the novel suffers because his characters are wooden and shaped to convenient patterns. It is as if they require to be brought to life by good actors in one of those rural settings which English film producers contrive so well.

Production
Conflict of Wings was originally called The Norfolk Story, and under this working title, the film was shot at Beaconsfield Film Studios, on location in Norfolk and in East Yorkshire at the Central Gunnery School, RAF Leconfield. 

The aircraft in the film included:
 Gloster Meteor T.7
 Gloster Meteor F.8
 de Havilland Vampire FB5 c/w VV624, VZ150, WA229, WA231, WA285
 de Havilland Vampire T.11 s/n WZ424 
 Supermarine Swift F1
 Avro Lincoln

Reception

Release
Conflict of Wings was re-titled for the American market as Fuss Over Feathers. It was released in New York City on 26 December 1954.

Critical response
In contemporary reviews of Conflict of Wings, the film generally received good reviews, and most of them were decidedly in favour of the RAF's position on the contretemps, and not so much the view of the villagers in protecting their bird sanctuary. "Virginia Graham of  The Spectator (02/04/54) wrote: "People who appreciate the calm, embellished with a little bird song, deserve our sympathy, of course, but the times are changing and it is only in the shelter of aluminium wings that England can build its nest??. Good example of Anglo-Saxon pragmatism!"

Aviation film historian Michael Paris in From the Wright Brothers to Top Gun: Aviation, Nationalism, and Popular Cinema (1995) described Conflict of Wings as reflecting the "international tensions of the 1950s". Paris goes on to describe how the threat to a natural sanctuary would "raise some interesting issues ..."  especially when national defence was involved.

Halliwell's Film & Video Guide described it as a "[sub]-Ealing comedy-drama with a highly predictable outcome; generally pleasant but without much bite."

References

Notes

Citations

Bibliography

 Harper, Sue and Vincent Porter. British Cinema of the 1950s: The Decline of Deference. Oxford University Press, 2003. .
 Paris, Michael. From the Wright Brothers to Top Gun: Aviation, Nationalism, and Popular Cinema. Manchester, UK: Manchester University Press, 1995. .
 Walker, John. (ed) Halliwell's Film & Video Guide 1998. HarperCollins Entertainment, 1998. 13th edition

External links

Conflict of Wings at AustLit
Conflict of Wings at BFI
Conflict of Wings Review at Variety
Conflict of Wings at AllMovie

1954 films
Films directed by John Eldridge
British comedy-drama films
1954 comedy-drama films
Films set in Norfolk
Films shot in Norfolk
British aviation films
Films shot at Beaconsfield Studios
Films shot in England
British Lion Films films
Films based on British novels
Films produced by Herbert Mason
Military humor in film
1950s English-language films
1950s British films